Julen Guerrero López (born 7 January 1974) is a Spanish former professional footballer who played solely for Athletic Bilbao as an attacking midfielder. He is the current manager of the Spain national under-17 team. 

He appeared in 430 official games for his only club, scoring 116 goals and helping them to finish second in La Liga in the 1997–98 season.

A Spain international since 1993, Guerrero represented the country at the 1994 and 1998 World Cups, as well as Euro 1996.

Club career
Born in Portugalete, Biscay, Guerrero joined Athletic Bilbao as an eight-year-old, and subsequently progressed through the junior ranks of the club. Along with Aitor Karanka he was a member of the under-19 team that won a national double of cup and league in 1991–92, and also appeared and scored for the reserves in the Segunda División during the same season.

Guerrero made his senior debut on 6 September 1992 aged 18, under Jupp Heynckes. He quickly made an impact and, although a midfielder, totalled 28 La Liga goals in his first two seasons (65 in six). He was awarded the New Spanish Player of the Year by El País in 1993, and won the Spanish Footballer of the Year by both Don Balón and El País the following year. In 1993–94 he scored a hat-trick against Albacete Balompié (4–1, home), adding four against Sporting de Gijón (7–0 also at the San Mamés Stadium); his arrival at the first team was met with unprecedented furor amongst the younger population due to both his footballing abilities and his charisma, and he became one of the first football celebrities as his pop-like figure boosted Athletic's image overseas. He finished the campaign with 18 – fifth in the charts– and was named the side's youngest-ever captain by Dragoslav Stepanović shortly after.

The early promise Guerrero showed attracted interest from, among others, Real Madrid, FC Barcelona, Atlético Madrid, Juventus FC, S.S. Lazio and Manchester United. However, he remained loyal to Athletic and, in 1997, signed a ten-year contract which was the longest in the club's history, and also made him the team's highest-paid player.

In 1997–98, Guerrero netted eight times in 29 matches as the Basques finished second, leading to direct qualification for the UEFA Champions League where he put on strong performances in the group stage against Juventus and Galatasaray SK. Subsequently, however, his career went into decline and, in 2002, he was deemed surplus to requirements by coach Luis Fernández while still only 28; in his last four seasons he could only manage 57 games with just four goals but, despite his poor form, remained a fan favourite, and the decision to drop him caused some controversy.

Guerrero announced his retirement as a player at an emotional press conference on 11 July 2006. He scored 116 goals in 430 competitive matches over the course of 14 seasons, including four in 17 appearances in various European competitions, but did not win any major honours.

Immediately after retiring, Guerrero took charge of the Lezama youth ranks, leaving the post after two years.

International career

On 27 January 1993, when still only 19, Guerrero made his debut for Spain in a friendly with Mexico, in Las Palmas. He went on to play 41 games and score 13 goals, and also represented the nation at the 1994 and 1998 FIFA World Cups and UEFA Euro 1996.

Among Guerrero's personal international highlights were hat-tricks against Malta (3–0 in Attard, on 18 December 1996) and Cyprus (8–0, 8 September 1999). His last international took place in October 2000.

Guerrero also played 11 times for the Basque Country autonomous team between 1993 and 2006, scoring six goals – this included another hat-trick in 1997, against Yugoslavia. Both were records for some years, although Xabi Prieto went on to appear in more matches and Aritz Aduriz scored more goals.

Style of play
Often hailed as one of the greatest attacking midfielders of his generation, Guerrero was ambidextrous, and was renowned for his free kicks and finishing skills, derived from his sharp nose for goals. He was often referred to by the media as El Rey León (The Lion King) and La Perla de Lezama (The Pearl of Lezama).

Personal life
Guerrero's younger brother, José Félix, was also a footballer and a midfielder. He also represented Athletic Bilbao, but only the reserves.

Julen also opened the Restaurante Julen Guerrero in Zamudio, and worked as an online columnist for Eurosport.

Career statistics

Club

International
Scores and results list Spain's goal tally first, score column indicates score after each Guerrero goal.

Honours
Spain U21
UEFA European Under-21 Championship third place: 1994

Individual
La Liga Breakthrough Player of the Year: 1993
Spanish Player of the Year: 1994

See also
List of one-club men

References

External links

1974 births
Living people
People from Portugalete
Sportspeople from Biscay
Spanish footballers
Footballers from the Basque Country (autonomous community)
Association football midfielders
La Liga players
Segunda División players
Bilbao Athletic footballers
Athletic Bilbao footballers
Spain youth international footballers
Spain under-21 international footballers
Spain international footballers
1994 FIFA World Cup players
UEFA Euro 1996 players
1998 FIFA World Cup players
Basque Country international footballers
Spanish football managers
Athletic Bilbao non-playing staff